Nogometni klub Puconci , commonly referred to as NK Puconci or simply Puconci, is a Slovenian football club which plays in the town of Puconci. They competes in the Pomurska League, the fourth tier of the Slovenian football pyramid. The club was established in 1953 and is currently named Kema Puconci due to sponsorship reasons.

Puconci enjoyed their most successful period between 1998 and 2003 when they played in the Slovenian Third League. In the 2000–01 season they also made their only appearance in the Slovenian Cup to date, where they reached the round of 16.

Honours
Slovenian Fourth Division
 Winners: 1996–97, 1997–98

Slovenian Fifth Division
 Winners: 2005–06, 2008–09

League history since 1991

References

Football clubs in Slovenia
Association football clubs established in 1953
1953 establishments in Slovenia